Notoplax latalamina is a species of chiton in the family Acanthochitonidae.

References
 Powell A. W. B., New Zealand Mollusca, William Collins Publishers Ltd, Auckland, New Zealand 1979 

latalamina
Chitons of New Zealand
Molluscs described in 1956